is a Japanese actress, voice actress and former pop singer. Nakajima made her debut on 30 January 1991. Her final JPOP release was on 10 June 1998. She sang the ending theme for the animated (anime) version of Ranma ½, Season 5 (1991) - "Red Poppy" (Hinageshi). She also sang the opening and ending themes of Floral Magician Mary Bell (1992–93).

Discography

Singles 
 30 January 1991: Akai Hanataba (赤い花束)
 17 April 1991: Hinageshi (ひなげし)
 The ending theme of Ranma ½, TV Season 5
 17 July 1991: Hatsukoi-Dōri (初恋通り)
 21 September 1991: Totemo Chiisana Monogatari (とても小さな物語)
 29 January 1992: Omoide ni mo Narenai (思い出にもなれない)
 The first ending theme of Floral Magician Mary Bell
 Coupled with Kitto Dekiru ne! (きっと出来るね！)—the opening theme of Floral Magician Mary Bell
 21 May 1992: Nikki no Kagi Kashimasu (日記の鍵貸します)
 18 September 1992: Omowareteiru (思われている)
 The second ending theme of Floral Magician Mary Bell
 21 January 1993: Hazukashii Yume (恥ずかしい夢)
 21 May 1993: Chotto Itai Kankei (ちょっと痛い関係)
 21 October 1993: Oteyawaraka ni (お手やわらかに)
 21 July 1994: Koi o Shimashō (恋をしましょう)
 10 June 1998: 1, 2, 3, Kimemasho (1･2･3キメましょ)

Albums 
 5 June 1991: Nakajima (PCCA-00274)
 22 November 1991: Kinenbi (mini-album) (PCCA-00316)
 1 July 1992: Tampopo (Tanpopo) (PCCA-00379)
 20 November 1992: Hijōshikina Wani (PCCA-00408)
 3 March 1993: Nakajima Michiyo BEST Stay with me ( Stay with me) ("Best Album") (PCCA-00435)
 16 December 1994: PRIVATE SELECTION I'll be there ( I'll be there) ("Best Album") (PCCA-00708)
 November 21, 1996: Nakajima Michiyo BEST Believe in you ( Believe in you) ("Best Album") (PCCA-01026)

References

External links 
 

1973 births
Living people
Japanese video game actresses
Japanese voice actresses
Musicians from Saitama Prefecture
Voice actresses from Saitama Prefecture
21st-century Japanese singers
21st-century Japanese women singers